The Box Soho is a cabaret nightclub located at 11-12 Walker's Court in Soho, London, on the premises formerly occupied by the Raymond Revuebar.

Opening and ownership
Opened on 9 February 2011, it bills itself as a "theatre of varieties" and is a sister club to The Box Manhattan, New York City. The club is owned by Simon Hammerstein, the grandson of lyricist Oscar Hammerstein II.

Performances
Performance artist Rose Wood is the headliner for both The Box Soho and Manhattan. Rose Wood (or "Miss Rosewood") is  'notorious' with Vice reporting that her "acts feature blood, manufactured excrement, toilets, and her body’s orifices; she’s emptied a condom on Leonardo DiCaprio and vomited on Susan Sarandon." The Guardian shared that an un-named club-goer described "acts involving acrobatics, threesomes, and men dressed as pigs licking food off strippers' stomachs" and reports that a "performer, known as 'Laqueefa', apparently playing well-known tunes with her genitalia."

See also
 List of strip clubs

References

External links
Official site

Nightclubs in London
2011 in London
Strip clubs in the United Kingdom
2011 establishments in England
Soho, London